André Obrecht (9 August 1899 – 30 July 1985) was the official executioner of France from 1951 until 1976.

Early life 
Born in Paris on 9 August 1899, Obrecht was the nephew of the chief executioner Anatole Deibler. He learned of his uncle's job at ten, when a series of postcards depicting an execution were published in September 1909. Following the death of his own son, who was born only one month after Obrecht, Deibler had a fatherlike relationship with young André, and the affection between the two men never ceased.

Career

Executioner 
Obrecht joined the executioners' team on 4 April 1922, as second assistant. By day, he worked in a factory as a machine operator. He remained as second assistant until 1939, when Anatole Deibler died. Due to financial obligations Deibler's widow allowed Obrecht's cousin Jules-Henri Desfourneaux and not Obrecht to succeed Deibler despite her late husband's indication that he would prefer Obrecht as his successor. Obrecht subsequently took Desfourneaux's former place as first assistant.

Obrecht and Desfourneaux disliked each other.  Obrecht thought his cousin too slow and badly organized. In late 1943, after having executed many French resistance fighters, Obrecht and his colleagues and friends, the Martin brothers, quit. Obrecht resumed his job in 1945, but his animosity towards his cousin had grown. After an execution in 1947, the cousins fought and Obrecht decided, for the second time, to quit.

Chief executioner 
When Desfourneaux died in 1951, Obrecht wrote to the Ministry of Justice, proposing his candidature as chief executioner. This was agreed and on 1 November 1951, he was officially nominated. On 13 November, he performed his first guillotining as chief in Marseilles when he executed the police killer Marcel Ythier.

As time passed by, the number of executions decreased. In the early 1970s, Obrecht learned he had Parkinson's disease. Though his health was poor, he guillotined four men, Roger Bontems and Claude Buffet in Paris on 28 November 1972 (kidnap and murder of a nurse and a jail warden during a prison mutiny, although Bontems was actually found innocent of murder), Ali Benyanès in Marseilles on 12 May 1973 (murder of a 7-year-old girl during a hold-up) and finally, also in Marseilles, Christian Ranucci on 28 July 1976 (for the kidnapping and murder of an 8-year-old girl).

Resignation 
On 30 September 1976, Obrecht resigned his position. The next day, his title was transferred to his nephew by marriage Marcel Chevalier, his assistant since 1958. Chevalier performed the final two guillotinings in France, of Jérôme Carrein in Douai and Hamida Djandoubi, both in 1977.

Death 
Obrecht died on 30 July 1985 in a Nice hospital. Four years later, reporter Jean Ker, who interviewed him many times, released a book called Le Carnet Noir du Bourreau (The Executioners' Black Diary), a biography. Obrecht left an image of himself as a normal man albeit a womaniser, quite authoritative at work and, more than anything else, lonely because of his job.

References 

1899 births
1985 deaths
Civil servants from Paris
French executioners